William Thomas Hunter French (20 April 1884 – 17 October 1972) was an Australian rules footballer who played with Essendon in the Victorian Football League (VFL).

A carpenter by trade, French enlisted to serve in World War I in April 1915. The night after joining the 7th Battalion at Gallipoli, French suffered a crushed back and concussion in heavy fighting at Lone Pine and was returned to Australia three months later.

Notes

External links 

1884 births
1972 deaths
Australian rules footballers from Victoria (Australia)
Essendon Football Club players